Claibornesville is a ghost town in Yazoo County, Mississippi, United States.

Claibornesville had a post office as early as 1846.

A comical short-story set in Claibornesville, entitled Mike Hooter's Fight With The Panther: A Yazoo Sketch,  was published in The Sydney Morning Herald in 1854.

References

Former populated places in Yazoo County, Mississippi
Former populated places in Mississippi